The Parana Open, or the Mesopotamia Open, was a golf tournament on the TPG Tour, the official professional golf tour in Argentina. First held in 1986, it has always been held at the Estudiantes de Paraná Golf Club in Paraná, Entre Ríos Province. This course hosted the Juan Jose Galli Four Ball Professional Cup from 2009 to 2011.

The tournament not held from 1988 to 1997, 2001, 2002 and 2004.

Winners

PO – won following playoff
* – tournament contested over 36 holes

External links
TPG Tour – official site

Golf tournaments in Argentina